Housatonic Community College (HCC) is a public community college in Bridgeport, Connecticut.  It part of the Connecticut State Colleges & Universities system. HCC grants associate degrees and also has certificate programs.

Campus

Lafayette Hall
In 1997, the Housatonic Community College moved to its present site. The first building on campus was Lafayette Hall, which currently hosts most of the college's STEM programs. In August 2017, construction was completed on a large expansion of the building, which now houses almost all of the school's administrative offices and student services (previously located in the original building), including admissions, advising, and the bursar's office.

Beacon Hall
In fall 2008, HCC added a new building, Beacon Hall. This structure consists of 174,000 gross square feet and is 3 floors high. Beacon Hall became the home to a new enlarged bookstore, a computer lab, and several new classrooms.

Museum of Art
The Housatonic Museum of Art is located on campus, with works displayed throughout the college and in the Burt Chernow Galleries. There are over 4,500 works in the collection and over 1,700 displayed throughout campus buildings. Burt Chernow was a former art historian, writer, and an art teacher in the Westport, CT school system. In 1997, Chernow died of a heart attack while employed as a Professor at Housatonic.

Honor Societies

Iota chapter of Delta Omega Epsilon Inc. is a fraternal organization which strives for discipline, dedication, and determination. Chi Rho is a chapter of the Phi Theta Kappa, an academic honor society for two-year colleges. The college also has an honors program, a chapter of Alpha Beta Gamma, the International Business Honor Society and a chapter of Psi Beta, the national honor society in psychology for community colleges.

References

External links

 Official website

Education in Bridgeport, Connecticut
Community colleges in Connecticut
Educational institutions established in 1967
Universities and colleges in Fairfield County, Connecticut
1967 establishments in Connecticut